Mir Ghulam Hasan, known simply as Mīr Ḥasan or Mir Hasan Dehlavi, was an biographer, critic, and Urdu poet.

He is known for his masnavis, the most famous being Sihar-ul-Bayan. Other notable works include a diwan of ghazals and Tazkira-i-Shora-i-Urdu, a tazkira of Urdu poets, written in Persian.

Biography 
Mir Hasan's ancestors were sayyids who belonged to Herat. His great grandfather Mir Imami migrated to India.

Mir Hasan was born in Delhi. His father, Mir Zahik, was a poet. Mir Hasan was educated in Urdu and Persian, and studied poetry as a child, submitting his poems to Khwaja Mir Dard for correction. After the invasion of India 1739 by Nader Shah, his father emigrated to Faizabad, the capital of Oudh. 

When the capital of Awadh was changed to Lucknow, Mir Hasan also settled there. He died in Lucknow after a period of illness. He left behind four sons, three of whom were poets themselves.

Notable works 
 Dīvān-i Mīr Ḥasan, A diwan of ghazals
 Eleven masnavis, of which Sihar-ul-Bayan is the most famous.
 Tazkira-i-Shora-i-Urdu, a tazkira of Urdu poets, written in Persian

Further reading

Bibliography

References 

1736 births
1786 deaths
Poets from Delhi
Mughal Empire poets
Urdu-language poets from India